The 1st. Czech National Hockey League was, along with the 1st. Slovak National Hockey League, the second level of ice hockey in Czechoslovakia from 1969 to 1993. The league was made up teams from the area of the modern Czech Republic.

Champions
1. ČNHL

1969–70 –
1970–71 –
1971–72 –
1972–73 –
1973–74 – TJ Gottwaldov
1974–75 – TJ Ingstav Brno
1975–76 – TJ Gottwaldov
1976–77 – TJ Slezan STS Opava
1977–78 – TJ Gottwaldov
1978–79 –
1979–80 – TJ Gottwaldov
1980–81 – TJ Zetor Brno

1981–82 –
1982–83 –
1983–84 –
1984–85 –
1985–86 –
1986–87 –
1987–88 –
1988–89 –
1989–90 –
1990–91 –
1991–92 –
1992–93 –

External links
History of Czechoslovak hockey
League results

2
Sports leagues established in 1969
1969 establishments in Czechoslovakia
1993 disestablishments in the Czech Republic
Czech
Czech